Kuhaulua is a surname. Notable people with the surname include:

Fred Kuhaulua (born 1953), Major League Baseball pitcher
Jesse Kuhaulua (born 1944), American sumo wrestler